Keijzer is a Dutch surname meaning "emperor" (modern Dutch keizer). The name contains a ij digraph that is often replaced with a "y", especially outside the Netherlands. Among variant forms of the surname are Keijser, Keijsers, Keijzers, Keizer, Keyser, De Keijzer, De Keyser, and De Keyzer. People with this name include:

Annemarie Keijzer (born 1958), Dutch equestrian 
Gerd de Keijzer (born 1992), Dutch racing cyclist
Ingrid Keijzer (born 1964), Dutch cricketer
Mona Keijzer (born 1968), Dutch CDA politician
Pieter Keijzer (born 1949), Dutch competitive sailor
Keijser
Harry de Keijser (1900–1995), Dutch pole vaulter and decathlete
Marieke Keijser (born 1997), Dutch rower
Mischa Keijser (born 1974), Dutch photographer, photojournalist and fine-art book-maker
 (born 1944), Swedish jazz musician
Keyzer
Mike Keyzer (1911–1983), Dutch VVD politician and diplomat
De Keyzer
Bruno de Keyzer (born 1949), French cinematographer
Carl De Keyzer (born 1958),  Belgian photographer
Jack de Keyzer (born 1955), British-born Canadian blues musician
Peter De Keyzer (born 1975), Belgian economist

References

Dutch-language surnames